Sakhnovschyna Raion was a raion (district) in Kharkiv Oblast of Ukraine. Its administrative center was the urban-type settlement of Sakhnovshchyna. The raion was abolished on 18 July 2020 as part of the administrative reform of Ukraine, which reduced the number of raions of Kharkiv Oblast to seven. The area of Sakhnovschyna Raion was merged into Krasnohrad Raion. The last estimate of the raion population was 

At the time of disestablishment, the raion consisted of one hromada, Sakhnovshchyna settlement hromada with the administration in Sakhnovshchyna.

References

Former raions of Kharkiv Oblast
1923 establishments in Ukraine
Ukrainian raions abolished during the 2020 administrative reform